Glomerulus is a common term used in anatomy to describe globular structures of entwined vessels, fibers, or neurons. Glomerulus is the diminutive of the Latin glomus, meaning "ball of yarn".

Glomerulus may refer to:
 the filtering unit of the kidney; see Glomerulus (kidney).
 a structure in the olfactory bulb; see Glomerulus (olfaction).
 the contact between specific cells in the cerebellum; see Glomerulus (cerebellum).

See also

Glomerulation, a hemorrhage of the bladder